The Federation of European Professional Photographers or Federation of European Photographers (FEP) is a nonprofit organization that organizes national professional photographers associations in the geographic area represented by the Council of Europe and has member organizations in some 29 countries. FEP is officially headquartered in Brussels. The Secretariat is in Rome. As the central reference authority for Photography in the European Union, it represents over 50.000 professional photographers in Europe.

The FEP is composed of the national professional associations of the following countries: Armenia, Austria, Azerbaijan, Belarus, Belgium, Croatia, Cyprus, Czech Republic, Denmark, Finland, France, Georgia, Germany, Hungary, Ireland, Italy, Latvia, Malta, Norway, Poland, Portugal, Russia, Serbia, Slovakia, Spain, Sweden, The Netherlands, Ukraine and United Kingdom.

Core principles 
The FEP defends the rights of professional photographers directly and in communion with national and international organisations. about-insetIt represents the interests of member associations on a global scale on topics like education, training, professional standards, authors rights etc. The FEP cooperates in the organisation of national events of member associations and international congresses, and promotes an exchange of keynote speakers.

History 
First FEP meeting took place in photokina in year 1992. It was decided to form an unrelated Federation of some national Associations. Franco Turcati, from Italy, was inaugurated as its President.

For a couple of years, the association met only as a "European annexe" to the WCPP (World Council of Professional Photographers), a global organization based in United States. The President of WCPP attended FEP meetings as a guest. There were endless and tiring discussions to decide if FEP should exist as a self-governing organization.
In those years, new members joined the Federation, and finally the new constitution was formally approved at the General Assembly held in Gmunden, Austria on April 4, 1997, signed by the founder members (the  Associations of Professional Photographers in Austria, Belgium, Czech Republic, France, Germany, Ireland, Italy, United Kingdom and Yugoslavia). The FEP was finally  registered under Belgian Law  in January 1999.

The main aim of the FEP was to validate the standard of qualifications of professional photographers throughout Europe. In 1998, with help of the British Institute of Professional Photography (the BIPP), the FEP instigated a European qualification called QEP.

In 2011 FEP joined the UEAPME, the European craft and SME’s network and the International Photographic Council at the UN.

Professional qualifications 

FEP offer to the Professional Photographers a system of qualifications which are recognized and accepted throughout Europe. These European qualifications which are known as EP, QEP and MQEP will complement but not replace any national qualification for Professional Photographers.

The European Photographer (EP) qualification aims to recognise competence and a professional standard for those who earn their lives as Professional Photographers. It is designed to complement the lack of a specific title to uphold the professional status. The EP is a new basic quality assurance certification now available to most general Professional Photographers throughout Europe.

The Qualified European Photographer (QEP) qualification aims to recognise and reward excellence in European Professional Photographers.  It is designed to complement national awards systems and has created a Europe-wide network of almost 500 certified experts who share a passion and talent for professional photography.

The Master Qualified European Photographer (MQEP) is the European  most distinguished award for outstanding photographers Certificate is reserved for the best QEP holders. To date about 50 Top European Photographers have received a master's degree for their supreme quality. You must be a member of an FEP member association to apply for the FEP European qualifications.

Competitions 

 Since 2008 - first FEP Professional Photographer of the Year Award run by FEP was launched.
 Since 2010 - the Photo Book Award
 Since 2013 - the FEP Emerging Talent Award (FETA)
 Since 2013  - World Photographic Cup (in cooperation with Professional Photographers of America)- a not-for-profit organization founded as a cooperative effort by The Federation of European Photographers (FEP) and Professional Photographers of America (PPA). Its singular goal is to unite photographers in a spirit of friendship and cooperation.

Member associations list

External links
 

Photography organizations
1992 establishments in Europe
Organizations established in 1992